Gummampadu is a village in West Godavari district in the state of Andhra Pradesh in India. Relangi and Velpuru Rail Way Station are the nearest railway stations.

Demographics
 India census, Gummampadu has a population of 1895 of which 971 are males while 924 are females. The average sex ratio of Gummampadu village is 952. The child population is 152, which makes up 8.02% of the total population of the village, with sex ratio 854. In 2011, the literacy rate of Gummampadu village was 74.76% when compared to 67.02% of Andhra Pradesh.

See also 
 West Godavari district

References 

Villages in West Godavari district